"Toca-Toca" is a song performed by Romanian band Fly Project. It was recorded in late 2013, in the duo's own recording studio. The song was released on 18 September 2013, on Roton Records. It is a bilingual Latin dance song, sung in English and Spanish and contains some similarities to Eurodance and house music.

The song became popular in early 2014 with Kontor - House of House dance series including it in Volume 19 in February 2014.
Following this, "Toca-Toca" became a huge hit in Romania, defending the third position for three non-consecutive weeks. In Spain's PROMUSICAE, the single reached number seventeen. In the French SNEP, the song became a top 10 hit and stayed in the charts for 24 weeks. It also became a top-50 hit in Belgium and a top-80 hit in Switzerland. Although it didn't reach the Italian charts, it was certified gold by the Federation of the Italian Music Industry, denoting downloads exceeding 15,000 units in Italy."Toca-Toca" was one of the best-selling singles of 2014 in Eastern Europe and reached, as reported by bestmusic.ro, number 56 in the famous chart Shazam World Top 100.

Music video
The official music video was released on 28 October 2013, and was filmed by Romanian director Alex Ceausu of Ador Media on Rin Grand Hotel's roof in Bucharest, Romania over a period of 24 hours.  The video focuses on two bears who meet and fall in love. When they arrive at a roof party, where Fly Project is singing, the bears try to get the duo on the stage to sing for them. The video exceeds 69 million views on the duo's official YouTube account as of 3 January 2017.

Track listings 
Digital download
 "Toca-Toca" (Radio Edit) - 
 "Toca-Toca" (Extended Version) - 

Italian remix EP (Released: February 13, 2014)
 "Toca-Toca" (Extended Version) - 4:47
 "Toca-Toca" (Pee4Tee Remix) - 4:18
 "Toca-Toca" (NRD1 Remix) - 5:27
 "Toca-Toca" (Gil Sanders Remix) - 4:21
 "Toca-Toca" (Radio Edit) - 2:45

The best of Fly Project EP (Released: October 09, 2014)
 "Musica" (Radio Edit) - 3:39
 "Toca-Toca" (Radio Edit) - 2:45
 "Back In My Life" (Radio Edit) - 3:16
 "Musica" (Mollela Remix) - 4:56
 "Musica" (Pee4Tee Remix) - 5:30
 "Toca-Toca" (Joe Bertė Remix) - 5:32
 "Toca-Toca" (Gigi Soriani Remix) - 4:29
 "Back In My Life" (Felipe C. Remix) - 5:36
 "Back In My Life" (Alex Noc Remix) - 5:16
 "Back In My Life" (Daniele P. Remix) - 7:09

Summer remixes EP (Released: July 29, 2014)
 "Toca-Toca" (Joe Bertė Remix) - 5:32
 "Toca-Toca" (Gigi Soriani Remix) - 4:29
 "Toca-Toca" (Daniele Tek Remix) - 6:02
 "Toca-Toca" (Felipe C. Remix) - 5:50
 "Toca-Toca" (Mastro J Remix) - 4:38
 "Toca-Toca" (Venuti & Guat Remix) - 4:44
 "Toca-Toca" (Joe Bertė Remix Edit) - 3:41

Charts and certifications

Weekly charts

Year-end charts

Certifications

References

2014 singles
Macaronic songs
2014 songs
Eurodance songs